Parnica may refer to:
Parnica, Gryfino County, Poland
Parnica, Szczecinek County, Poland
Párnica, Slovakia
Parnica (Maglaj), Bosnia and Herzegovina